Diu district  is one of the three districts of the union territory of Dadra and Nagar Haveli and Daman and Diu of India. The district is made up of Diu Island and two small enclaves on the Indian mainland. The district headquarters are at Diu Town. It is the ninth least populous district in the country (out of 640).

History
The district was historically part of the Saurashtra region of Gujarat. Mirroring the system of administrative division in Portugal, Diu district (Distrito de Diu) was established as an administrative division of the Portuguese State of India (Estado da Índia) in the first half of the 19th century. It was headed by a district governor, subordinate to the governor-general of Portuguese India in Goa. The district included the single municipality of Diu, which was further subdivided into civil parishes.

It remained an overseas territory of Portugal until it was annexed by Indian forces on 19 December 1961. From 1961 to 1987, it was a part of the union territory of Goa, Daman and Diu. In 1987, it became a part of the newly formed union territory of Daman and Diu. In January 2020, the district became part of the new union territory of Dadra and Nagar Haveli and Daman and Diu.

Geography

It consists of Diu Island and a part on the mainland (the Ghogolá peninsula).  20 km East of Diu Island, is the small territory of Simbor.

Diu Island 
Diu Island is the place where the town of Diu is located. Diu Fortress is also located on Diu Island.

Mainland 
The area on the mainland borders Gir Somnath district of Gujarat. It contains the village of Ghogola. The village lies on the mainland opposite the eastern end of the island .

The tiny territory of Simbor, located about 25 km east of the town of Diu, is also part of the district.

Sub-Districts
 Diu Island
 Gogolá
 Simbor

Demographics
According to the 2011 census Diu district has a population of 52,074, roughly equal to the nation of Saint Kitts and Nevis. This gives it a ranking of 631st in India (out of a total of 640). Its population growth rate over the decade 2001-2011 was  17.73%. Diu has a sex ratio of 1030 females for every 1000 males, and a literacy rate of 83.36%.

Sister cities 
Diu Island is twinned with the city of Loures, in Portugal.

Tourism 
Diu is home to various buildings and monuments with Portuguese-styled architecture. The nearest railway junction is Veraval, which is 90 km from Diu. Major cities like Mumbai, Ahmedabad, Pune, Jabalpur (Madhya Pradesh), Dwarka and Thiruvananthapuram are directly connected to Veraval Railway Station. Delwada is 8 km from Diu.

Fortresses and churches
Diu Fort
St. Thomas Church, Diu, now a museum.
Nadia Caves
St. Paul's Church, Diu
Fortim do Mar, Diu
Fortim do Mar, Simbor

Beaches
 Nagoá Beach, most visited beach in Diu and has a fort ruin.
 Ghogolá Beach, largest beach off the island of Diu
 Chakratirth Beach
 Barra Beach has a fort ruin

Gallery

References

External links 
 Official website

 
Districts of Dadra and Nagar Haveli and Daman and Diu